This article is a demography of the population of Antigua and Barbuda including population density, ethnicity, religious affiliations and other aspects of the population.

Population

According to the 2011 census the estimated resident population of Antigua and Barbuda was 86,295.

Vital statistics

Structure of the population

Structure of the population (27.05.2011) (Census) :

Ethnic groups
The population of Antigua and Barbuda, is predominantly black (91.0%) or mixed (4.4%). 1.9% of the population is white and 0.7% East Indian. There is also a small Amerindian population: 177 in 1991 and 214 in 2001 (0.3% of the total population). The remaining 1.6% of the population includes people from the Middle East (0.6%) and China (0.2%).

The 2001 census disclosed that 19,425, or 30 per cent of the total population of Antigua and Barbuda,  reported their place of birth as a foreign country. Over 15,000 of these persons were from other Caribbean states, representing 80 of the total foreign born. The main countries of
origin were Guyana, Dominica and Jamaica. Approximately 4,500 or 23 per cent of all foreign
born came from Guyana, 3,300 or 17 per cent came from Dominica and 2,800 or 14 per cent
came from Jamaica. The largest single group from a country outside the region came from the
United States. Of the total of 1,715 persons, nine per cent of the foreign born, came
from the United States while three per cent and one per cent came from the United Kingdom and Canada, respectively. Many of these are the children of Antiguans and Barbudans who had emigrated to these countries, mainly during the 1980s, and subsequently returned.

Other demographics statistics
Demographic statistics according to the World Population Review in 2019.

One birth every 360 minutes	
One death every 720 minutes	
One net migrant every Infinity minutes	
Net gain of one person every 720 minutes

Demographic statistics according to the CIA World Factbook, unless otherwise indicated.

Population
99,287 (Feb. 2022 est.)

Nationality
Noun: Antiguan(s), Barbudan(s)
Adjective: Antiguan, Barbudan

Ethnic groups 
African descent 87.3%, mixed 4.7%, Hispanic 2.7%, white 1.6%, other 2.7%, unspecified 0.9% (2011 est.)
note: data represent population by ethnic group

Age structure 

0-14 years: 22.52% (male 11,243/female 10,871)
15-24 years: 16.15% (male 7,891/female 7,961)
25-54 years: 41.68% (male 18,757/female 22,167)
55-64 years: 10.74% (male 4,693/female 5,848)
65 years and over: 8.91% (male 3,736/female 5,012) (2020 est.)

Median age
Total: 32.7 years  Country comparison to the world: 106th
Male: 30.7 years
Female: 34.4 years (2020 est.)

Birth rate 
15.3 births/1,000 population (2021 est.) Country comparison to the world: 113th

Death rate 
5.63 deaths/1,000 population (2021 est.) Country comparison to the world: 177th

Total fertility rate 
1.96 children born/woman (2021 est.) Country comparison to the world: 117th

Net migration rate 
2.06 migrant(s)/1,000 population (2021 est.) Country comparison to the world: 49th

Population growth rate
1.17% (2021 est.) Country comparison to the world: 84th

Population distribution
The island of Antigua is home to approximately 97% of the population; nearly the entire population of Barbuda lives in Codrington

Languages
English (official), Antiguan creole

Religions
Protestant 68.3% (Anglican 17.6%, Seventh Day Adventist 12.4%, Pentecostal 12.2%, Moravian 8.3%, Methodist 5.6%, Wesleyan Holiness 4.5%, Church of God 4.1%, Baptist 3.6%), Roman Catholic 8.2%, other 12.2%, unspecified 5.5%, none 5.9% (2011 est.)

Life expectancy at birth
Total population: 77.6 years  Country comparison to the world: 92nd
male: 75.4 years 
female: 79.9 years (2021 est.)

Urbanization
urban population: 24.4% of total population (2020)
rate of urbanization: 0.55% annual rate of change (2015-20 est.)

Dependency ratios
Total dependency ratio: 45.3 (2020 est.)
Youth dependency ratio: 31.8 (2020 est.)
Elderly dependency ratio: 13.6 (2020 est.)
Potential support ratio: 7.4 (2020 est.)

Education expenditures
2.5% of GDP (2009) Country comparison to the world: 160th

Obesity - adult prevalence rate 
18.9% (2016) Country comparison to the world: 113rd

Literacy
Definition: age 15 and over has completed five or more years of schooling
Total population: 99% 
Male: 98.4% 
Female: 99.4% (2015)

School life expectancy (primary to tertiary education) 
Total: 15 years 
Male: 14 years 
Female: 16 years (2012)

References

 
Society of Antigua and Barbuda